Carth Onasi is a fictional character and party member in the 2003 action role-playing video game Star Wars: Knights of the Old Republic, developed by BioWare and published by LucasArts. A skilled pilot and decorated war hero of the Galactic Republic who served in the Mandalorian Wars, an important background conflict to the Knights of the Old Republic series, Carth plays a key role in the war between the Jedi-backed Galactic Republic and Sith Forces during the Jedi Civil War depicted in Knights of the Old Republic and its sequel, Star Wars: Knights of the Old Republic II: The Sith Lords. He is also a romance option for female characters. Carth later appears as a recurring supporting character in the monthly Star Wars: Knights of the Old Republic prequel comic book series. He is voiced by American actor Raphael Sbarge in the video games.

Although Carth is considered one of the most well known characters from the Knights of the Old Republic series, critical reception to the character has been polarized, with much of the criticism focused on the character's perceived bland personality, self-righteous behavior, and lack of trust towards others.

Conception and creation

Carth Onasi originated in pen and paper West End Games Star Wars RPG sessions held by the game's lead designer, James Ohlen. In his book Star Wars: Knights of the Old Republic which explored the developmental history of the eponymous game, Alex Kane described Carth as a "well-dressed, well-groomed Han Solo type sporting a goatee and an orange leather jacket".  He was visualized by John Gallagher, concept art director of the game, though Gallagher considered the character's final visual design to be lacking in distinctiveness and is "largely disposable". Carth is voiced by Raphael Sbarge; Darragh O’Farrell, the voice-over director for the game, noted that he had previously worked with a relatively inexperienced Sbarge for the 1998 video game Grim Fandango, and that he was much improved from a mic-technique standpoint by the time he was cast as Carth.

Carth's first appearance in the Knights of the Old Republic comic series, as a helmet-wearing bearded pilot in the bridge of The Courageous, is retroactively recognized as issue #8. Series writer John Jackson Miller clarified that while he had always intended Carth to be on board the Courageous for the Battle of Vanquo, the specific character was not originally meant to be Onasi as Miller did not specifically instruct the issue's artist Dustin Weaver to depict a specific character. On perusing the finished issue, Miller along with several others had assumed that the character Dustin had drawn in the scene was Carth.

Character
Carth is presented as an expert pilot who is the pilot-in-command of the Ebon Hawk, and a war veteran who specializes in dual-wielding blaster pistols. Prior to the events of the first game, Carth's homeworld of Telos IV was devastated by the Sith under the orders of Admiral Saul Karath, his former commanding officer and mentor. His wife Morgana was killed in the attack and his son, Dustil is missing and presumed dead. This led Carth to swear revenge against Karath. Furthermore, Saul's betrayal along with the defection of many former Republic officers to the Sith have left him with trust issues, almost to the point of paranoia. Carth may later meet Dustil as an indoctrinated Sith recruit in the Sith Academy on Korriban.

Carth is available as a heterosexual romance option for a female player character in the game, with a branching arc leading to two different endings which is dependent on dialogue choices that cumulatively orient her towards a light or dark side alignment. If she remains true to the Jedi, Carth falls in love with her, and helps her get into the Star Forge to confront Darth Malak and his new apprentice, a fallen Bastila Shan. If she chooses to return to the dark side after a romantic relationship is established, Carth reappears at the Star Forge in an unsuccessful attempt to convince her to return to the light, after which she may either murder Carth by her own hand or order Bastila to finish him off.

Appearances

Knights of the Old Republic
Carth is assigned to the cruiser Endar Spire during the Jedi Civil War when it was ambushed by a Sith fleet over the planet Taris. He narrowly escapes by taking an escape pod to the planet surface with an amnesiac Revan, who was memory wiped and given a new identity as a rank-and-file Republic soldier. The two searched for, and eventually rescued, the Jedi Bastila Shan from a swoop bike gang. Stealing the ship the Ebon Hawk from the crime lord Davik Kang, Carth and his companions escape Taris just as Darth Malak orders an orbital bombardment on its surface. After arriving at the Jedi Academy on Dantooine, he was tasked with searching for the Star Maps and the Star Forge along with Bastila and Revan. While searching for the Star Maps, Carth and his companions were captured by Admiral Karath and taken aboard his ship, the Leviathan. After breaking out, Bastila, Carth, and Revan managed to make it to the bridge of the ship, where Saul is defeated and killed. As he lay dying, Saul whispered Revan's true identity to Carth, to his dismay. Depending on Revan's alignment and relationship with Carth, Carth may accept that Revan is no longer a Sith Lord and had truly been redeemed. In the alternative, if Revan sides with Bastila later in the game and reassumes the mantle of Dark Lord of the Sith, Carth flees from the party and disappears: if the dark-sided Revan is female, Carth will confront her and Bastila in the Star Forge's hangar after the defeat of Darth Malak, leading to a second boss fight.

Knights of the Old Republic II: The Sith Lords
Depending on dialogue options made by the player character during certain conversations about how the aftermath of the so-called Jedi Civil War in the first game affects the branching narrative for Star Wars: Knights of the Old Republic II: The Sith Lords, Carth may make a brief appearances in the game, or be referenced by other characters such as HK-47. According to the continuity established by the massively multiplayer online role-playing game sequel Star Wars: The Old Republic, Revan is male and remains loyal to the Jedi and the Republic.

In The Sith Lords, following the destruction of the Star Forge and the end of the Jedi Civil War and if Revan returns to the Jedi, Carth is promoted to Admiral. Revan tasked Carth with protecting the Republic and left in search for the true Sith Empire in the Unknown Regions prior to the events of the game. When the Sith Lord Darth Nihilus attacks Telos five years after the end of the Jedi Civil War, Carth leads the Republic fleet in defense of the planet and the space station orbiting above it. He also requests to speak with the Jedi Exile about Revan's whereabouts, where his dialogue content will differ depending on Revan's gender and the nature of his relationship with Revan. If Revan is female and if the player completes T3-M4's repairs, the droid will play a holovid recording of Carth discussing Revan, which again differs in content based on her final moral alignment.

If Revan is stated to have returned to the Dark Side, Carth does not physically appear in the game; his dialogue sequences are replaced by a different Republic Admiral.

Other appearances
Carth first appears in Issue No. 8 of the Star Wars: Knights of the Old Republic comic series as the helmsman serving aboard the Inexpugnable-class tactical command ship Courageous. He is often referred to by the nickname "Fleet" during this time period. Carth participates in several battles, where he eventually met the fugitive Padawan Zayne Carrick, who is disguised as a janitor. Carth later appears in a more prominent role for several of the series' story arcs.

Wizards of the Coast created a miniature for the character, along with other characters in the Knights of the Old Republic series, which was released August 19, 2008.

A holostatue of Carth is erected in the Coronet City on Corellia, along with the statues of Revan and his other companions in The Old Republic, which is set 300 years after the events of the first game.

Carth is an unlockable character in the mobile game Star Wars: Galaxy of Heroes.

Reception

Carth Onasi proved to be a divisive character among commentators. Wes Felon from PC Gamer in particular despises the character, as he enjoyed roleplaying as an evil-aligned character in the game. Fenlon has variously referred to Carth as a "token goody two-shoes soldier boy", "the most self-righteous soldier in the galaxy", and an "uncool Han Solo". He thought of Carth as a "bland" character at best, a sentiment shared by Anthony John Agnello from The A.V. Club. In another article, Agnello said Carth comes across as a "brash hero, but turns out to be as needy as he is noble". John Walker from Eurogamer criticized Carth for his moralistic behavior, and called the character an "all-round do-gooding mummy's boy", "whiny-faced snorefest", and "simpering idiot". Game Informer staff called Carth "gaming's greatest pioneer in the field of being a total wiener", and listed him among the five worst Star Wars characters. Stephen Bush from The New Statesman commented that "Carth's only redeeming feature is that you can leave him aboard your ship once you leave Knights’ crushingly dull tutorial world of Taris". As a male companion available early in the game, Carth was also compared unfavorably to Atton Rand from The Sith Lords by IGN's Hilary Goldstein, and Phil Owen from Kotaku. Owen said Carth is much less interesting to converse with in contrast to Atton. Goldstein considered Atton to be less annoying then Carth.

Conversely, some commentators have ranked Carth in positive “top” character lists. John Jackson Miller said Carth was his favorite out of the series' secondary characters who originated from the video games, and he particularly enjoyed writing Carth's brotherly dynamic with series protagonist Zayne Carrick. Brendan Lowry from Windows Central called Carth an intriguing character and said he is fascinated by the character's views, as the Star Wars series rarely place the spotlight on the opinions, beliefs, and experiences of the common foot soldier. Kane is of the view that Carth is a complex hero who is underrated by many series fans, though the game's producer Mike Gallo observed that there are revelers at fan conventions who publicly show their appreciation for the character.

Fenlon commented that he recognized the voice of Mass Effect's Kaidan Alenko, who is also voiced by Raphael Sbarge, to be reminiscent of Carth's "smarmy reproaches". Fenlon decided that since Carth "showed up disguised as Kaidan in Mass Effect", he refused to bring him along to missions as a squad mate. He noted on reflection that his dislike of Kaidan is an extension of his dislike of Carth's "smug, holier-than-thou voice", and that hearing it immediately made him angry. On the other hand, Kane argued that Sbarge's performance "exudes an effortless charisma, but is also defined by the memories of wartime that haunts the character".

References

Bibliography

External links
 

BioWare characters
Star Wars Legends characters
Star Wars video game characters
Star Wars: Knights of the Old Republic characters
Fictional admirals
Fictional military personnel in video games
Fictional prison escapees
Fictional space pilots
Fictional war veterans
Male characters in video games
Role-playing video game characters
Science fantasy video game characters
Video game characters introduced in 2003
Video game sidekicks